"Real Voice" is the third single from female Japanese artist, Ayaka. The song was used as the ending theme to the J-Drama, Suppli. The single reached a peak of eleven on the Oricon weekly singles chart.

Track listing

Charts
Oricon Sales Chart (Japan)

2006 singles
Ayaka songs
Japanese television drama theme songs
Songs written by Ayaka